The Cumbok affair, also known as the Cumbok War, was a series of battles that took place in the Pidie Regency of Aceh in the Dutch East Indies between 2 December 1945 and 16 January 1946. Conflict broke out between ulama (teungku) who supported the Proclamation of Indonesian Independence and had united in the Persatuan Ulama Seluruh Aceh (PUSA), and the local ulèëbalang aristocracy (teuku) who continued to support Dutch colonial rule, causing a revolution in the social fabric of the Acehnese people at the time.

References

Conflicts in 1945
Conflicts in 1946
1945 in Indonesia
1946 in Indonesia
Indonesian National Revolution
Battles of the Indonesian National Revolution
Dutch East Indies
December 1945 events in Asia
January 1946 events in Asia
History of Aceh